Johann Samuel König (31 July 1712 – 21 August 1757) was a German mathematician.

Biography
Johann Bernoulli instructed both König and Pierre Louis Maupertuis as pupils during the same period.  König is remembered largely for his disagreements with Leonhard Euler, concerning the principle of least action. He is also remembered as a tutor to Émilie du Châtelet, one of the few female physicists of the 18th century.

Gallery

Notes

External links

18th-century German mathematicians
Members of the French Academy of Sciences
1712 births
1757 deaths
People from Büdingen
Academic staff of the University of Franeker